Epischnia plumbella is a species of snout moth in the genus Epischnia. It was described by Ragonot in 1887. It is found on Sicily.

References

Moths described in 1887
Phycitini
Endemic fauna of Italy
Moths of Europe